Cosmê Tura (1495), also known as Il Cosmè or Cosimo Tura, was an Italian early-Renaissance (or Quattrocento) painter and considered one of the founders of the School of Ferrara.

Biography

Formation
The painter's origins are humble: he was born in Ferrara, the son of a shoemaker named Domenico. There is no news on his apprenticeship, which Vasari linked to the mysterious artist Galasso Ferrarese, an almost mythical figure, linked by friendship to Piero della Francesca.

The first documents concerning him are dated to the two-year period 1451–1452, when he decorated some objects for the Este court, such as some flags with Este coats of arms for the Castle or a helmet given as a prize to the winner of a tournament. These works were the order of the day in the artistic workshops and represented for them one of the major sources of livelihood. Perhaps he was able to work among the court illuminators.

From mid-1452 to April 1456 there are no other documents in Ferrara on the presence of Tura, so it has been hypothesized that he may have undertaken a journey, perhaps staying in Venice and, especially, in Padua, as many clues seem to suggest it stylistic in his works. Perhaps it was the Este themselves who sponsored his apprenticeship trip, probably interested in his precocious artistic skills. The workshop of Francesco Squarcione was active there, the most important forge of talents in northern Italy from which many masters who spread the Renaissance style such as Carlo Crivelli, Michael Pacher and above all Andrea Mantegna came out.

From the Paduan experience Tura would have drawn the taste for a clear and sharp sign and for a decorative exuberance, with references to the antique, which he then took to extreme levels. Moreover, Squarcione filtered the Tuscan novelties brought to Padua by Donatello, consisting in the use of linear perspective, in the strong and squaring lines of the forms and in the ability to give human expressiveness to the figures.

Another fundamental master for him was Piero della Francesca, whom he perhaps met personally in Ferrara in 1458–1459, from whom he borrowed the sense for the geometric spatial construction, the monumental spirit and the use of a clear light, which he used above all in the backgrounds. The third fundamental input was the work of the Flemish, also visible in Ferrara in the marquis collections, from whom he learned a taste for minute observation of details and for the rendering, through the use of oil painting, of the different textures of the materials. , from the glitter of gems to the soft reflections of velvets.

Under Borso d'Este

In 1456 Tura therefore returns to Ferrara, where he becomes a painter in the full sense, appearing among the court salaried, even with domicile in the castle, which testifies to his post as court painter, replacing Angelo Maccagnino who had died on August 5 of that year. In Ferrara he worked for Borso d'Este and Ercole I d'Este, never leaving. Gifted with great personality and multiform skills, he was present in all the artistic manifestations of the Este court and the various dukes who succeeded each other, in the fifty years of his artistic life, used it in the most disparate works, as befits the court artists of the time, who did not know a rigid specialization: he was, as well as a skilled painter, set designer at parties and tournaments, decorator of furniture, clothes, blankets, pottery, and designer of tapestry cartoons.

Among his earliest works, a lost lunette for the door of the cathedral is documented. Works such as the Madonna and Child with Saints from the Fesch Museum in Ajaccio and the Madonna and Child from the National Gallery of Art in Washington, D.C. are usually attributed to this period.

In 1458 he is documented at work in the Belfiore studio, where the artist continues Maccagnino's work, probably also repainting some of the works he started (Terpsichore from the Poldi Pezzoli Museum in Milan and Calliope from the National Gallery in London).

By 1460, he was given a stipend by the Ferrarese Court. His pupils include Francesco del Cossa and Francesco Bianchi.

In the following years he worked on frescoes, such as in the chapel of Francesco Sacrati in San Domenico (1467) and the Stories of the Virgin in the delight of Belriguardo (1469-1472) for Borso d'Este, cycles both lost but known from the sources.

Although these were years of feverish activity, only the grandiose doors of the organ of the Ferrara Cathedral remain from that period, paid for on 2 June 1469, where he painted the Annunciation on one side and St. George and the princess on the other. He collaborated in the painting of a series of "muses" for a Studiolo of the Palace Belfiore of Leonello d'Este in Ferrara, including the allegorical figure of Calliope at the National Gallery in London. While the individual attributions are often debated, among the artists thought to complete the series were Angelo di Pietro da Siena, also called Maccagnino or Angelo Parrasio, and Michele Pannonio.

One of his houses during the painter's stay in Ferrara was certainly in via delle Vecchie, which for a long time was called the Tura road for this reason.

Under Ercole I
With the rise to power of Ercole I d'Este (1471), Tura was appointed court portraitist, a role he devoted himself to until 1486 when he was replaced by the younger Ercole de' Roberti.

The Roverella Polyptych, from 1470 to 1474, is today divided into several museums. Painted to commemorate the bishop of Ferrara Lorenzo Roverella, the central part is in the National Gallery in London with the Madonna and Child seated on an elaborate throne and surrounded by musician angels.

He also worked on the decorations of rooms, studies and the library of Giovanni Pico della Mirandola. In Ferrara, he is well represented by frescoes in the Palazzo Schifanoia (1469–71). This pleasure palace, with facade and architecture of little note, belonged to the d'Este family and is located just outside the medieval town walls. Cosimo, along with Francesco del Cossa and Ercole de' Roberti, helped produce an intricately conceived allegorical series about the months of the year and zodiac symbols. The series contains contemporary portraits of musicians, laborers, and carnival floats in idyllic parades. As in Piero della Francesca's world, the unemotive figures mill in classical serenity. This is considered the greatest collective essay of the Ferrara school as well as one of the most singular pictorial cycles of the European Renaissance.

Despite his loyalty to the Este family, to whom he gave the work of his whole life and having been the leader of a group of Emilian artists, Cosmè Tura died tired and poor, as is attested by one of his letters of 1490 to Duke Ercole, to whom he solicited the payment of one of his works, perhaps the marvelous Sant'Antonio da Padova, currently in the Galleria Estense in Modena, literally stating "I do not know how to live and substent in this way because I do not find a profession or facultate that I substentino with my family".

The events of the history of Ferrara, with the ruinous parable of the dukes at the end of the 16th century, led to the destruction of most of his works.

Style
Tura's painting is endowed with great originality in the Italian panorama of the time, featuring lavishly decorated compositions and an almost sculptural plasticity of the figures, in an apparent realism that belongs more to fantasy rather than reality. The colors are bright and unreal, which often make the subjects seem like metal or stone, immersed in a tense and surreal atmosphere, with a dreamlike flavor. The experiences derived from the courteous art of international Gothic, with their celebratory intentions, are fused and transformed through the influence of the Paduan Renaissance, Piero della Francesca and Flemish painting. The meticulous search for details and impossible landscapes is found later in painters of the Danubian school.

Selected works

Saint George - San Diego Museum of Art
Pieta - Museo Correr, Venice
Judgment of Saint Maurelius and Martyrdom of Saint Maurelius (1470s) - Pinacoteca Nazionale, Ferrara
The Circumcision of Christ (1470s) - Isabella Stewart Gardner Museum, Boston
Madonna and Child (1455) - National Gallery of Art, Washington D.C.
Portrait of Eleonora d'Aragona, Duchess of Ferrara - Pierpont Morgan Library, New York
Spring or the muse "Calliope" (1460) - National Gallery, London
The Princess (1470) - Museo del Duomo, Ferrara
St. John the Evangelist in Patmos (c. 1470–1475) - Thyssen-Bornemisza Museum, Madrid
St. George and the Dragon (1469) - Museo del Duomo, Ferrara
Madonna Enthroned (1474) -  National Gallery, London
St. Sebastian  - Gemäldegalerie, Dresden, Germany
St. Dominic - Uffizi, Florence
Pietà, (Louvre)
Side Panels from a Portable Triptych Showing Saints Peter and John the Baptist - Philadelphia Museum of Art
St. Anthony of Padua Reading - Louvre, Paris
Saint Nicholas - Musée des Beaux-Arts de Nantes
St Anthony of Padua (c.1484-1490) - Galleria Estense, Modena
Letter A, miniature from choirbook (Metropolitan Museum, New York)

References

Bibliography
Haldane Macfall, History of Painting: The Renaissance in Venice Part Two, page 34, .

External links

trionfi.com

Cosme Tura at Panopticon Virtual Art Gallery
Italian Paintings: North Italian School, a collection catalog containing information about Tura and his works (see pages: 61–67).
Cosme Tura at the National Gallery of Art

Italian Renaissance painters
Painters from Ferrara
Quattrocento painters
1430s births
1495 deaths
Italian male painters
15th-century Italian painters